The Pleșa is a right tributary of the river Timiș in Romania. It flows into the Timiș near Prisaca.

References

Rivers of Romania
Rivers of Caraș-Severin County